Songjeong-dong may refer to 

Songjeong-dong, Seoul
Songjeong-dong, Busan
Songjeong-dong, Ulsan
Songjeong-dong, Gwangju
Songjeong-dong, Gwangju, Gyeonggi
Songjeong-dong, Gangneung
Songjeong-dong, Donghae